Jamie Murray and Neal Skupski were the defending champions, but chose to compete in San Diego with different partners instead.

Jonny O'Mara and Ken Skupski won the title, defeating Oliver Marach and Philipp Oswald in the final, 6–3, 6–4.

Seeds

Draw

Draw

References

External Links
 Main Draw

Sofia Open
Sofia Open